Weerapat Pitakanonda (born 4 September 1983) is a Thai equestrian. He competed in the individual eventing at the 2020 Summer Olympics.

References

External links
 

1983 births
Living people
Weerapat Pitakanonda
Weerapat Pitakanonda
Equestrians at the 2020 Summer Olympics
Place of birth missing (living people)
Event riders
Asian Games medalists in equestrian
Equestrians at the 2002 Asian Games
Equestrians at the 2006 Asian Games
Equestrians at the 2010 Asian Games
Medalists at the 2010 Asian Games
Weerapat Pitakanonda
Weerapat Pitakanonda